Betta smaragdina, commonly known as the emerald green betta, blue betta or Mekong fighting fish is a species of gourami native to Southeast Asia. The species gets its green and blue colors due to refraction and interference of light that results from hexagonal crystals that are less than 0.5 micrometres. It is found in the aquarium trade.

Description

Distribution
Betta smaragdina is native to Thailand and Laos, where it occurs in the basins of the Mekong and Chao Phraya Rivers, being frequently found in the Mun River and the Chi River in the region of Isan in Thailand.

Habitat
Betta smaragdina lives in still or sluggish bodies of water, including rice paddies, swamps, roadside ditches, streams and ponds. These bodies of water are usually shaded by vegetation and have a substrate composed of leaf litter, mud, or sand.

Conservation status
Betta smaragdina is listed as data deficient by the IUCN. It is uncommon throughout its range and the population of the species is still decreasing. It is threatened by habitat destruction, pollution, and hybridization with escaped domesticated bettas.

Diet
In the wild, Betta smaragdina feeds on terrestrial and aquatic invertebrates. In captivity, it is typically fed live or frozen food like Daphnia, Artemia or bloodworms.

Breeding
Male individuals of Betta smaragdina will build a bubble nest before breeding. The temperature at which breeding typically occurs is 25.6 to 26.7 °C (78 to 80 °F). Males and females can live together and the male and female should already live together for breeding. When the female is interested in mating, she becomes lighter coloured and develops vertical bars. After mating, the male catches the falling eggs and places them in his bubble nest. In 1 to 2 days, the eggs hatch and continue absorb their yolk sack for 3 to 4 days. In 4 to 5 days, the fry become free swimming. Until this point in time, the male cares for them.

In the aquarium
This species is often kept by Betta hobbyists but is rarely available in the aquarium trade. The "alien" hybrid betta is a hybrid of wild bettas in the Betta splendens complex, including B. smaragdina.

Gallery

References

External links
The Aquarium Wiki Encyclopaedia on Betta Smaragdina
Siamese cyberAquarium, Types of plakatthai

smaragdina
Fish of Thailand
Taxa named by Werner Ladiges
Fish described in 1972